Holice may refer to

 Holice, a town in the Pardubice Region of the Czech Republic
 Holice, Dunajská Streda District, a municipality and village in the Trnava Region of Slovakia
 Holice, a former village, now part of the city of Olomouc in the Czech Republic